Laugenour is a former settlement in Yolo County, California. It lay at an elevation of 46 feet (14 m).  It still appeared on maps as of 1916.  Founded by the Laugenour family from South Carolina, they continued to farm here, but built Victorian mansions in Woodland and Oroville.  Hazel Bess Laugenour, granddaughter, became the first woman to swim the Golden Gate in 1911.   The land on which Laugenour was founded enabled the family's wealth to be ranked 10th behind Leland Stanford's 1st place.

References

External links

Former settlements in Yolo County, California
Former populated places in California